Beckendorf may refer to:

 Benkendorf, a village in Saxony-Anhalt, Germany, sometimes also spelled Beckendorf
 Beckendorf Lake, in Renville County, Minnesota, USA
 Beckendorf-Neindorf, a town in Saxony-Anhalt, Germany
 Beckendorf River or Beckendorfer Mühlenbach, a river in North Rhine-Westphalia, Germany
 Bob and Elsa Beckendorf, gospel singing duo that inspired Songs of the Heart
 Charles Beckendorf, demigod in Camp Half-Blood
 Heinie Beckendorf, American baseball player